Dubbo, an electoral district of the Legislative Assembly in the Australian state of New South Wales, has had two incarnations, the first from 1895 to 1904, the second from 1930 to the present.


Members for Dubbo

Election results

Elections in the 2010s

2019

2015

2011

Elections in the 2000s

2007

2004 by-election

2003

Elections in the 1990s

1999

1995

1991

Elections in the 1980s

1988

1984

1981

Elections in the 1970s

1978

1976

1973

1971

Elections in the 1960s

1968

1965

1962

Elections in the 1950s

1959

1956

1953

1950

Elections in the 1940s

1947

1944

1942 by-election

1941

Elections in the 1930s

1938

1935

1932

1930

1904 - 1930
District abolished

1901
This section is an excerpt from 1901 New South Wales state election § Dubbo

Elections in the 1890s

1898
This section is an excerpt from 1898 New South Wales colonial election § Dubbo

1895
This section is an excerpt from 1895 New South Wales colonial election § Dubbo

1894
This section is an excerpt from 1894 New South Wales colonial election § Dubbo

References

New South Wales state electoral results by district